Pataki may refer to:

 Pataki (surname)
 Hungarian name of Potoky, Slovakia
 Hayden v. Pataki
 Pataki (film), a 2017 Indian Kannada Language film

See also 
 Patakí stories
 Potaki (disambiguation)
 Potok (disambiguation)
 Potocki family, an artistocratic family originating from Potok in the Kraków Voivodeship